"Ibiza" is the twenty-fourth single released by English electronic dance music band the Prodigy. It was released through the band's official YouTube channel in March 2015 as a single from their sixth album The Day Is My Enemy. The song features English hip hop duo Sleaford Mods.

Content 

The song is an attack against superstar DJ culture. Liam Howlett explained that "we did a gig in Ibiza, and I'm not a great fan of the place, but it isn't an attack on the island, it's an attack on these mindless fucking jokers that arrive in their Learjets, pull a USB stick out of their pockets, plug it in and wave their hands in the air to a pre-programmed mix."

The song was released as a limited edition glow-in-the-dark vinyl on Record Store Day 2015.

Track listing

References 

The Prodigy songs
2015 singles
Songs written by Liam Howlett
2015 songs
Cooking Vinyl singles
Songs about Ibiza